Jörg Bode (born 12 November 1970) is a German politician of the Free Democratic Party (FDP), formerly serving as the Minister for Economics, Labour and Transport and Deputy Prime Minister of the state of Lower Saxony.

He was elected to the Landtag of Lower Saxony in 2003, and has been re-elected on one occasion. On 28 October 2009, Bode succeeded Philipp Rösler as the Minister for Economics, Labour and Transport and Deputy Prime Minister of the State of Lower Saxony. He served as Acting Prime Minister from 30 June until 1 July, following the resignation of Christian Wulff, who was elected President of Germany.

References

Free Democratic Party (Germany) politicians
Ministers of the Lower Saxony State Government
Members of the Landtag of Lower Saxony
1970 births
Living people